The Mandelbulb is a three-dimensional fractal, constructed for the first time in 1997 by Jules Ruis and in 2009 further developed by Daniel White and Paul Nylander using spherical coordinates.

A canonical 3-dimensional Mandelbrot set does not exist, since there is no 3-dimensional analogue of the 2-dimensional space of complex numbers. It is possible to construct Mandelbrot sets in 4 dimensions using quaternions and bicomplex numbers. 

 

where
 
 
 

For n > 3, the result is a 3-dimensional bulb-like structure with fractal surface detail and a number of "lobes" depending on n. Many of their graphic renderings use n = 8. However, the equations can be simplified into rational polynomials when n is odd. For example, in the case n = 3, the third power can be simplified into the more elegant form:

 

The Mandelbulb given by the formula above is actually one in a family of fractals given by parameters (p, q) given by

 

Since p and q do not necessarily have to equal n for the identity |vn| = |v|n to hold, more general fractals can be found by setting

 

for functions f and g.

Cubic formula

Other formulae come from identities parametrising the sum of squares to give a power of the sum of squares, such as

which we can think of as a way to cube a triplet of numbers so that the modulus is cubed. So this gives, for example,
 
 
 
or other permutations.

This reduces to the complex fractal  when z = 0 and  when y = 0.

There are several ways to combine two such "cubic" transforms to get a power-9 transform, which has slightly more structure.

Quintic formula

Another way to create Mandelbulbs with cubic symmetry is by taking the complex iteration formula  for some integer m and adding terms to make it symmetrical in 3 dimensions but keeping the cross-sections to be the same 2-dimensional fractal. (The 4 comes from the fact that .) In two dimensions, where , this is
 
 

This can be then extended to three dimensions to give
 
 
 

for arbitrary constants A, B, C and D, which give different Mandelbulbs (usually set to 0). The case  gives a Mandelbulb most similar to the first example, where n = 9. A more pleasing result for the fifth power is obtained by basing it on the formula .

Power-nine formula

This fractal has cross-sections of the power-9 Mandelbrot fractal. It has 32 small bulbs sprouting from the main sphere. It is defined by, for example,

 
 
 

These formula can be written in a shorter way:
 
and equivalently for the other coordinates.

Spherical formula
A perfect spherical formula can be defined as a formula
 
where
 
where f, g and h are nth-power rational trinomials and n is an integer. The cubic fractal above is an example.

Uses in media 

 In the 2014 computer-animated film Big Hero 6, the climax takes place in the middle of a wormhole, which is represented by the stylized interior of a Mandelbulb.
 In the 2018 science fiction horror film Annihilation, an extraterrestrial being appears in the form of a partial Mandelbulb.
 In the webcomic Unsounded the spirit realm of the kerht is represented by a stylized golden mandelbulb.

See also

 Mandelbox
 List of fractals by Hausdorff dimension

References 

6.  http://www.fractal.org the Fractal Navigator by Jules Ruis

External links 

 for the first use of the Mandelbulb formula on www.fractal.org website Jules Ruis
 Mandelbulb: The Unravelling of the Real 3D Mandelbrot Fractal, on Daniel White's website
 Several variants of the Mandelbulb, on Paul Nylander's website
 An opensource fractal renderer that can be used to create images of the Mandelbulb
 Formula for Mandelbulb/Juliabulb/Juliusbulb by Jules Ruis
 Mandelbulb/Juliabulb/Juliusbulb with examples of real 3D objects
 Video : View of the Mandelbulb  
 Video : Exploring Mandelbulb. 3D Fractal Animation 
 The discussion thread in Fractalforums.com that led to the Mandelbulb
 Video fly through of an animated Mandelbulb world

Fractals